The Cedar River is a  river in the central Adirondacks, in Hamilton County, New York. It rises at the outlet of Cedar Lake in the Town of Arietta and flows northeast into the Town of Lake Pleasant, where it passes through the Cedar River Flow. Continuing northeast and east, it passes through the Town of Indian Lake and remote corners of the Towns of Minerva and Newcomb to join the Hudson River northeast of the hamlet of Indian Lake. The Northville-Placid Trail goes past the Cedar Lakes and along the Cedar River to the flow.

Cedar River Flow

The Cedar River Flow, located on the river, is a remote  shallow lake, created by the Wakely Dam.

Islands

 Elm Island – Located north of Indian Lake.

References

 Hayes, John and Wilson, Alex, Quiet Water Canoe Guide, New York, Appalachian Mountain Club: Boston, 1996.  

Adirondacks
Rivers of New York (state)
Rivers of Hamilton County, New York
Tributaries of the Hudson River